Peirce Lynch, alias Peter Lynch, fl. 1485–1486, was the first Mayor of Galway.

The son of John Lynch fitz Edmond, as well as a brother of Dominick Dubh Lynch, and a member of one of The Tribes of Galway, Peirce became the first Mayor of Galway in August 1485, being succeeded by his brother Dominck in August 1486. His grandfather, Edmond Lynch, was Sovereign of Galway in the years 1434 and 1443. Their ancestor, Thomas de Linche, was provost of Galway in 1274. Descendants of the family continued to hold office regularly up to 1654.

See also
 Tribes of Galway
 Galway

References
 History of Galway, James Hardiman, Galway, 1820.
 Old Galway, Maureen Donovan O'Sullivan, 1942.
 Henry, William (2002). Role of Honour: The Mayors of Galway City 1485–2001. Galway: Galway City Council.  
 Martyn, Adrian, The Tribes of Galway:1124–1642, Galway, 2016. 

Mayors of Galway
15th-century Irish businesspeople
15th-century Irish politicians